JGA may refer to:

 Japan Golf Association
 John G. Althouse Middle School
 Justice Guild of America
 Juxtaglomerular apparatus
 Nihon Ki-in (Japan Go Association)
 Jamnagar Airport IATA code